The ten percent plan, formally the Proclamation of Amnesty and Reconstruction, was a United States presidential proclamation issued on December 8, 1863, by United States President Abraham Lincoln, during the American Civil War. By this point in the war (nearly three years in), the Union Army had pushed the Confederate Army out of several regions of the South, and some Confederate states were ready to have their governments rebuilt. Lincoln's plan established a process through which this postwar reconstruction could come about.

Background
A component of President Lincoln's plans for the postwar reconstruction of the South, this proclamation decreed that a state in rebellion against the U.S. federal government could be reintegrated into the Union when 10% of the 1860 vote count from that state had taken an oath of allegiance to the U.S. and pledged to abide by Emancipation. Voters could then elect delegates to draft revised state constitutions and establish new state governments. All Southerners except for high-ranking Confederate army officers and government officials would be granted a full pardon. Lincoln guaranteed Southerners that he would protect their private property, though not their slaves. By 1864, Louisiana, Tennessee, and Arkansas had established fully functioning Unionist governments.

This policy was meant to shorten the war by offering a moderate peace plan. It was also intended to further his emancipation policy by insisting that the new governments abolish slavery.

Reaction
Congress reacted sharply to this proclamation of Lincoln's plan. Most moderate Republicans in Congress supported the president's proposal for Reconstruction because they wanted to bring a swift end to the war, but other Republicans feared that the planter aristocracy would be restored and the blacks would be forced back into slavery. Lincoln's reconstructive policy toward the South was lenient because he wanted to popularize his Emancipation Proclamation. Lincoln feared that compelling enforcement of the proclamation could lead to the defeat of the Republican Party in the election of 1864, and that popular Democrats could overturn his proclamation.

The Radical Republicans opposed Lincoln's plan, as they thought it too lenient toward the South. Radical Republicans believed that Lincoln's plan for Reconstruction was not harsh enough because, from their point of view, the South was guilty of starting the war and deserved to be punished as such. Radical Republicans hoped to control the Reconstruction process, transform Southern society, disband the planter aristocracy, redistribute land, develop industry, and guarantee civil liberties for former slaves. Although the Radical Republicans were the minority party in Congress, they managed to sway many moderates in the postwar years and came to dominate Congress in later sessions. In the summer of 1864, the Radical Republicans passed a new bill to oppose the plan, known as the Wade–Davis Bill. These radicals believed that Lincoln's plan was too lenient, and this new bill would make readmission into the Union more difficult. The Bill stated that for a state to be readmitted, the majority of the state would have to take a loyalty oath, not just ten percent. Lincoln later pocket-vetoed this new bill.

See also
 Forty acres and a mule
 Freedmen's Bureau
 Treatment of slaves in the United States

References

 Foner, Eric. Forever Free: The Story of Emancipation & Reconstruction. New York: Vintage Books, 2005.

External links

 The Proclamation of Amnesty and Reconstruction Freedmen & Southern Society Project of the History Department of the University of Maryland

Presidency of Abraham Lincoln
American Civil War documents
Slavery in the United States
Reconstruction Era
United States presidential directives
Pardons